The Seychelles Democratic Party is a political party in Seychelles. It was founded by the late Sir James Mancham in 1964, and governed the country from 1976 to 1977.

History
After a time in exile in the United Kingdom, Mancham returned to the islands following the Seychelles' transition to democracy in 1993. He had led the SDP from the time of its founding. At the last elections of 6 December 2002 the party won 3.1% of the vote and failed to gain representation in the National Assembly. In February 2005 Mancham stepped down with Nichol Gabriel assuming the leadership of the party. In March 2006 Paul Chow was elected as party leader in a vote held by the executives of the party.

Electoral history

Presidential elections

National Assembly elections

References 

Main
Political parties in Seychelles